Harper Glacier  is a small tributary glacier which descends northeast between Mount Gibbs and Mount Adamson of the Deep Freeze Range to enter Campbell Glacier, in Victoria Land, Antarctica. It was mapped by the United States Geological Survey from surveys and U.S. Navy air photos, 1960–64, and was named by the Advisory Committee on Antarctic Names for Wayne M. Harper, a satellite geodesist at McMurdo Station, 1964–65.

References

Glaciers of Victoria Land
Scott Coast